Judith Church (born 19 September 1953) is a former politician in the United Kingdom.

Having unsuccessfully fought Stevenage in 1992, she was the Labour Member of Parliament for Dagenham from winning the seat at a by-election in June 1994 until she stood down at the 2001 general election.

Early life
She went to St Bernard's Convent School (now called St Bernard's Catholic Grammar School - a grammar school) in Slough. She attended the University of Leeds, gaining a BA in Maths and Philosophy in 1975. After that she went to Huddersfield Polytechnic, Aston University and Thames Valley College. She became a factory inspector. She stood in 1992 in Stevenage.

Personal life
She is separated and has two sons.

References

External links
 They Work For You
 Ask Aristotle

1953 births
Living people
Alumni of the University of Leeds
Labour Party (UK) MPs for English constituencies
Female members of the Parliament of the United Kingdom for English constituencies
UK MPs 1992–1997
UK MPs 1997–2001
Place of birth missing (living people)
People educated at St Bernard's Catholic Grammar School
20th-century British women politicians
21st-century British women politicians
20th-century English women
20th-century English people
21st-century English women
21st-century English people